André Diamant (born February 9, 1990) is a Brazilian chess Grandmaster. He won the Brazilian Chess Championship in 2008 and 2009 and played for Brazil in the Chess Olympiads of 2008 and 2010.

Diamant is of Jewish origin and represents the club A Hebraica (São Paulo). His peak Elo rating was 2547.

Notable games
Robert Kempinski vs Andre Diamant, Essent 2008, Queen's Gambit Accepted: Classical Defense, Steinitz Development Variation (D26), 0-1

References

External links

André Diamant at 365Chess.com

1990 births
Living people
Brazilian Jews
Brazilian chess players
Jewish chess players
Chess grandmasters
Maccabiah Games competitors for Brazil
Maccabiah Games chess players
Chess Olympiad competitors